Hourglass is the second solo studio album by English vocalist Dave Gahan, released on 17 October 2007 by Mute Records. It received generally favourable reviews; most critics complimented its electronica sound, while some criticised it for sounding too similar to Gahan's group Depeche Mode.

Critical reception

At Metacritic, which assigns a normalised rating out of 100 to reviews from mainstream critics, the album received an average score of 64, based on 18 critical reviews, which indicates "generally favorable reviews."

Ben Hogwood of musicOMH wrote, "Gahan, it seems, is progressing into a well-rounded, mature songwriter who plays to all his strengths, and in particular the cracked voice, and its ability to move from a confidential whisper to a rabble-rousing bellow. These songs show him in a newly redemptive prime and will satisfy both short and long term devotees".

Track listing
All tracks are written by Dave Gahan, Christian Eigner and Andrew Phillpott.

"Saw Something" – 5:14
"Kingdom" – 4:34
"Deeper and Deeper" – 4:34
"21 Days" – 4:35
"Miracles" – 4:38
"Use You" – 4:48
"Insoluble" – 4:57
"Endless" – 5:47
"A Little Lie" – 4:53
"Down" – 4:34

Bonus tracks
All bonus tracks appear on the iTunes edition of Hourglass.
 "Kingdom" (Digitalism Remix) – 5:36
"Use You" (K10K Remix) – 6:03
"Deeper and Deeper" (SHRUBBN!! Dub) – 4:43

DVD
 "Hourglass – A Short Film" – 17:52
 "Kingdom" (promotional video) – 4:33
 "Hourglass – The Studio Sessions" – 20:03
 "Saw Something"
 "Miracles"
 "Kingdom"
 "A Little Lie"
 "Endless from Hourglass. The Studio Sessions" – 3:44

Personnel
Credits adapted from the liner notes of Hourglass.

Musicians
 Dave Gahan – vocals
 John Frusciante – guitar solo 
 Graham Finn – bass ; guitar 
 Tony Hoffer – guitar 
 Niko Stoessl – additional guitar ; backing vocals 
 Kevin Murphy – cello on "Saw Something" 
 Jenni Muldaur – backing vocals 
 Karl Ritter – Dobro

Technical
 Dave Gahan – production
 Christian Eigner – production
 Andrew Phillpott – production
 Tony Hoffer – mixing ; engineering 
 Andy Marcinkowski – mixing assistance ; engineering 
 Ryan Hewitt – recording 
 Niko Stoessl – additional editing 
 Kurt Uenala (K10K) – additional editing, additional engineering
 Stephen Marcussen – mastering

Artwork
 Dave Gahan – design
 Tom Hingston Studio – design
 Anton Corbijn – photography, Hourglass logo design

Charts

Certifications and sales

Release history

Notes

References

2007 albums
Dave Gahan albums
Mute Records albums
Virgin Records albums